Eua Airport , known in Tonga as Kaufana Airport, is an airport in Eua, Tonga. The airfield is an unsealed coral strip.

References

External links 
 Solomon Airlines Routes

Airports in Tonga
ʻEua